Pllp

lp

PPPP may refer to:pp]]

 Pigeons Playing Ping Pong, a band
 Pakistan Peoples Party Parliamentarians, related to the l

 Pakistan Peoples Party
 Polska Partia Przyjaciół Piwa, the plPolish Beer-Lovers' Party